The 1976 Long Beach State 49ers football team represented California State University, Long Beach during the 1976 NCAA Division I football season.

Cal State Long Beach competed in the Pacific Coast Athletic Association. The team was led by third year head coach Wayne Howard, and played home games at Veterans Stadium adjacent to the campus of Long Beach City College in Long Beach, California. They finished the season with a record of eight wins, three losses (8–3, 2–2 PCAA).

Schedule

Team players in the NFL
The following were selected in the 1977 NFL Draft.

Notes

References

Long Beach State
Long Beach State 49ers football seasons
Long Beach State 49ers football